Lepista sordida is a species of blewit mushroom found across the Northern Hemisphere. It is known to form fairy rings.

References

Edible fungi
Lepista
Tricholomataceae
Fungi of Europe
Fungi found in fairy rings